Walter Presch (5 August 1910 – 13 March 1991) was an Austrian football player and manager.

Playing career
Presch spent his career in Austria, Switzerland and France.

Managerial career
Presch coached Aarau, B 1909, Angers, Viborg FF Lausanne, Young Fellows, Biel-Bienne, KB and Strasbourg.

References

External links
 Player profile 
 Manager profile 

1910 births
1991 deaths
Austrian footballers
Association football forwards
Ligue 1 players
Ligue 2 players
First Vienna FC players
Neuchâtel Xamax FCS players
SC Young Fellows Juventus players
Hyères FC players
RC Strasbourg Alsace players
Olympique Lillois players
FC Sète 34 players
Red Star F.C. players
AS Cannes players
Austrian football managers
FC Aarau managers
Viborg FF managers
Boldklubben 1909 managers
FC Lausanne-Sport managers
SC Young Fellows Juventus managers
FC Biel-Bienne managers
Kjøbenhavns Boldklub managers
RC Strasbourg Alsace managers
Angers SCO managers
Austrian expatriate footballers
Austrian expatriate football managers
Austrian expatriate sportspeople in Switzerland
Expatriate footballers in Switzerland
Expatriate football managers in Switzerland
Austrian expatriate sportspeople in France
Expatriate footballers in France
Expatriate football managers in France
Austrian expatriate sportspeople in Denmark
Expatriate football managers in Denmark